In Greek mythology, Euphorbus (Ancient Greek: Εὔφορβος Euphorbos) was a Trojan hero during the Trojan War.

Description 
Euphorbus was a handsome man described to have the loveliest locks among the curly-haired. He had a lot of gold bound into his braid of hair along with other ornaments around his head.

Family 
Euphorbus was the son of Panthous and Phrontis according to Homer and thus brother to Polydamas and Hyperenor. But according to Orpheus, his parents were the naiad Abarbarea and Boucolides, illegitimate son of Laomedon, and probably the brother of the twins Aesepus and Pedasus.

Mythology 
Euphorbus wounded Patroclus before the Achaean hero was killed by Hector or according to Tzetzes, he was the second to strike Patroclus for the god Apollo was the first one. In the fight for Patroclus' body, Euphorbus was killed by Menelaus. He was apparently one of Troy's finest warriors. Menelaus later took Euphorbus' shield to the temple of Hera in Argos. There are some accounts that claim that it was Euphorbus, not Aeneas, Cycnus or Hector, that killed Protesilaus.

The philosopher Pythagoras claimed to be a reincarnation of Euphorbus, according to Heraclides of Pontus (as reported by Diogenes Laërtius) and Philostratus. In the Metamorphoses of Ovid (15, 160–164), Pythagoras is again said to have claimed to be a reincarnation of Euphorbus.

See also 
 4063 Euforbo, Jovian asteroid
 List of Greek mythological figures

Notes

References 

 Homer, The Iliad with an English Translation by A.T. Murray, Ph.D. in two volumes. Cambridge, MA., Harvard University Press; London, William Heinemann, Ltd. 1924. . Online version at the Perseus Digital Library.
 Homer, Homeri Opera in five volumes. Oxford, Oxford University Press. 1920. . Greek text available at the Perseus Digital Library.
 Tzetzes, John, Book of Histories, Book I translated by Ana Untila from the original Greek of T. Kiessling's edition of 1826. Online version at theoi.com
 Tzetzes, John, Book of Histories, Book II-IV translated by Gary Berkowitz from the original Greek of T. Kiessling's edition of 1826. Online version at theoi.com

Trojans
Greek mythological heroes